Scamorza is a Southern Italian cow's milk cheese. It can also be made from other milks, but that is less common. It is a stretched-curd cheese, in which the fresh curd matures in its own whey for several hours to allow acidity to develop through the conversion of lactose to lactic acid. Artisanal cheese makers generally form the cheese into a round shape, and then tie a string around the mass one third of the distance from the top, and hang it to dry. The resulting shape is pear-like. This is sometimes referred to as "strangling" the cheese. The cheese is usually white unless smoked. When smoked, the color is almond with a lighter interior.

Scamorza can be substituted for mozzarella in most dishes, but the resulting taste will be much stronger and more dominant. It is reputed to melt better in baking. Using the smoked variety  adds a prominent background flavor in replacement of mozzarella.

Etymology

Production areas
In Italy, scamorza is more commonly made in the south. Strictly speaking, scamorza is a product of Apulia and Calabria. However, it is available across the country, both in the unsmoked and smoked forms. Mario Batali cites grilled scamorza as a traditional dish in Neapolitan cooking. Scamorza in Bari is made from sheep's milk. This is not necessarily true of cheeses called scamorza outside the EU.

See also

 List of cheeses
 List of smoked foods
 List of stretch-curd cheeses

References

Cow's-milk cheeses
Mixed-milk cheeses
Smoked cheeses
Stretched-curd cheeses
Italian cheeses